The 2007 T in the Park festival took place on 6, 7 and 8 July 2007. The event was the first time the festival had been held over three days. The new Friday evening which included Lily Allen, Arctic Monkeys and The Coral was only available to 50,000 people who purchased weekend and camping tickets which gave access to the festival arena.

Tickets
The first 35,000 tickets went on sale shortly after the 2006 festival and were sold within 70 minutes. The final batch of 40,000 tickets, were released on the 9th of March and sold out in less than 20 minutes.

Event
The first day was marred by traffic congestion with up to 13 hours of delays and 12 miles of tailbacks on the southbound M90 motorway, which was the knock on effect of Heavy rain causing the main car parks to flood and eventually led to their complete closure. The Scots term ye shouldnae even a came became well known at the 2007 festival; as several security staff directed the comment at "revellers" who complained about the appalling traffic.

A month later the police apologised for traffic chaos at T in the Park. Tayside chief constable John Vine revealed  over 20 letters had been sent out in response to complaints, as the event was heavily criticised by locals. In a report to his police board, Vine said the force were carrying out a full review of operations at the festival.  He said: "Discussions have taken place with organisers. There will also be a fundamental review of contingency plans and, in particular, traffic management."

The number of arrest was down from the previous years 70 to 64, with 30 people taken into custody. 617 people were treated at the hospital tent which was slightly higher than the previous years figure. 53 patients were transferred to NHS hospitals off site which is well below the norm for the event. 400 tonnes of rubbish was removed in 2006 and this year the waste has been reduced to 350 tonnes with 40% of that being recycled.

Line up
Amy Winehouse and Gogol Bordello pulled out at the last minute due to "exhaustion" and to duet with Madonna at Live Earth, respectively. Tokyo Police Club failed to turn up for unknown reasons, as did You Say Party! We Say Die! and New Creations.

"We agreed that it was the highlight of our career so far," said Brandon Flowers of The Killers' headline set. "The crowd were amazing. We felt we could do no wrong. That was the first time I ever thought, 'Wow, this is what it's like being in U2!'"

The 2007 line-up was as follows:

Main Stage

Radio 1/NME Stage

King Tut's Tent

Pet Sounds Arena

Slam Tent

Futures Stage

T-break Stage

links
 http://www.list.co.uk/article/2376-t-in-the-park-2007-running-times/
 http://www.virtualfestivals.com/t-in-the-park-2007/news

References 

2007 in Scotland
T in the Park
2007 in British music
July 2007 events in Europe
2007 music festivals